The Real World is an American reality television show in which a group of strangers live together in a house for several months, as cameras record their interpersonal relationships. First broadcast in 1992, the show is the longest-running program in MTV history, consistently ranking as a top-rated cable series among viewers 12–34 years old.

As of Season 32, a total of 252 cast members have appeared on the show. There have been nine instances in which an original cast member left the house during production and was replaced by another roommate. During Season 2, David Edwards was asked to leave by his roommates and Irene Berrera-Kearns left because she got married. Edwards and Berrera-Kearns were replaced by Beth Anthony and Glen Naessens. David "Puck" Rainey was evicted from the house by his roommates during Season 3 and replaced by Joanna "Jo" Rhodes. However, Puck remained part of the cast and was heavily featured in the remaining episodes. During Season 14, Frankie Abernathy left the show due to homesickness and conflict with roommates and was replaced by Charlie Dordevich. Shauvon Torres of Season 19 left the show to pursue a relationship back home and was replaced by Ashli Robson. During Season 20, Greg Halstead was removed from the show after being fired from work, and Joey Kovar left to show to enter a 30-day treatment program for alcoholism. Halstead and Kovar were replaced by Nick Brown and Brittini Sherrod. In Season 25, Adam Royer was evicted and replaced by Heather Cooke.  In Season 28, Joi Neimeyer left for personal reasons and was replaced by Nia Moore.

There have been fourteen instances in which a cast member left the house during production but was not replaced with another roommate. This often depended on how much time left was there before production wrapped, hence, bringing a new roommate if little time is left would not have been convenient. Irene McGee left Season 7 due to concerns with the show's purpose and ethics as well as the conditions not being suitable for her health condition. Justin Deabler left Season 8 for personal reasons. In Season 19, Trisha Cummings was evicted from the house due to a physical confrontation that led to production staff giving the other cast member the choice as to whether Cummings could stay. Joey Rozmus of Season 22 was removed from the show after being fired from his job. Erika Wasilewski of Season 23 left the house due to personal reasons. Ryan Leslie of Season 24 was evicted by his roommates due to unstable behavior, the first to have been evicted by the entire rest of the cast since Rainey. Brandon Kane was evicted from Season 27 by production after failing a drug test. In Season 29, Ashley Mitchell left during the season after asking her roommates to vote whether they wanted her to stay. Based on her drunken, unstable behavior, many in the house voiced opposition and Ashley did not want to stay if all were not okay with it and left. During the same season, additional roommate and "Ex" Lauren Ondersma left the show a few weeks after arriving for unexpected personal reasons and "Ex" Hailey Chivers left later in the season due to the stress of the living situation. In Season 31, CeeJai Jenkins and Jenna Thompson were removed from the show by production after getting into a physical altercation with a week left of filming. In Season 32, Mike Crescenzo chose to leave the house after saying multiple racial comments and fearing how he will be portrayed on-air despite having remorse over his choice of words. Later that season, Theo King-Bradley was removed from the show by production after the start of a physical altercation with his cousin, who joined the cast as Theo's Bad Blood counterpart, when it became apparent no resolution would occur between the two cousins. During the same season, Tyara Hooks left for unexpected personal reasons. Later that season, Peter Romeo was evicted by production for hostile behavior towards numerous roommates.

There have been four instances in which cast members left the residence but remained part of the show. As mentioned above, Puck remained part of the cast after being evicted from the cast residence by his roommates on the show's third season. In Season 5, Melissa Padrón left the house on her own after finding the living situation with some of the other roommates unhealthy, but Padrón remained part of the production and cast assignment. In Season 22, Bronne Bruzgo was banned from residing at the cast's hotel suite by hotel management due to throwing a hotel fire extinguisher from the suite into a pool many feet below. Bruzgo was given residence in the staff quarters of the cast's employer and was allowed to visit the suite. He could not stay but remained part of the production. In Season 28, Johnny Reilly, Averey Tressler, and Daisy (Tressler's pet dog) voluntarily moved out of the cast's loft to a hotel after physical violence and continued threats from a fellow castmember. Reilly, Tressler, and Daisy remained part of the production until filming wrapped.

There has been three instances where a non-original cast member were added to live as an additional roommate. In Season 29, Exes of some of the original roommates were each misled by producers to believing that he or she would be a replacement for former roommate, Ashley Mitchell. Instead, the Exes would be moving in as well until move-in day, expanding the cast from seven to twelve. The additional roommates or the "Exes" were Ashley Ceaser, (Arielle's ex-girlfriend), Brian Williams, Jr. (Jenny's ex-boyfriend), Hailey Chivers (Thomas's ex-girlfriend), Jenna Compono (Jay's ex-girlfriend) and Lauren Ondersma (Cory's ex-girlfriend). In Season 31, Dylan Moore was given the opportunity to join the cast without replacing anyone by completing a mission with the cast. Because he was successful, the cast expanded to eight roommates. In Season 32, seven people who still or once used to have connections with the originals were secretly sent to Portland, and were informed later that they are going to live with the original cast, expanding the cast to fourteen. Each person are known as "Bad Blood" or people who the originals once got along with but now have a rift with due to various issues. The additional roommates or "Bad Blood" were Anna Stack (Katrina's older sister), Jennifer Geoghan (Robbie's ex-girlfriend), Kassius Bass (Theo's estranged cousin), Kimberly Johansson (Tyara's former high school classmate rival), Orlana Russell (Jordan's former friend), Peter Romeo (Mike's estranged former roommate), and Will Groomes III (Anika's ex-boyfriend).

Cast members

 Cast member's age at the start of the season

References

General
 
 
 
 
 
 
 
 
 
 
 
 
 
 
 
 
 
 
 
 
 
 
 
 
 
 
 
 
 
 
 
 
Specific

Lists of reality show participants